Almost all pallasite meteorites are part of the pallasite main group.

References

Meteorite groups